A list of Citroën vehicles

Current models

Historic models

Alternative fueled
Citroën Alternative propulsion includes the following:

Biofuels
Biofuel Citroëns include the Citroën C4 BioFlex (bioethanol flexible fuel vehicle).

Electric and hybrid vehicles
In the earlier years, electric cars were produced, e.g. the AX electrique, Saxo electrique etc. but in smaller series.

In the hybrid electric vehicle strategy there are four concept cars HYmotion at the Paris Motor Show 2008: Hypnos, illustrating the latest breakthroughs in this field with the hybrid technology HYmotion4; the C4 HYmotion2 and C-Cactus ( diesel-electric hybrid), reflecting Citroën's plans to integrate this promising solution in affordable mass-market vehicles; and the C4 WRC HYmotion4, extending ecological principles to sports cars.

Citroën showed the plug-in hybrid  REVOLTe at the 2009 Frankfurt Motorshow.

Concept cars

Citroën has produced numerous concept cars over the decades, previewing future design trends or technologies. Notable concepts include the Citroën Karin (1980), Citroën Activa (1988), Citroën C-Métisse (2006), GT by Citroën (2008) and Citroën Survolt (2010).

4x4 Conversions

Dangel, a French specialist automobile company based in Sentheim, Alsace, has produced 4x4 versions of Citroën and Peugeot vehicles since 1980. Its first conversion was the Peugeot 504. Dangel currently produces 4x4 conversions of the Citroën Berlingo, the Citroën Jumper and the Citroën Jumpy.

Aircraft
In the early 1970s Citroën investigated the possibility of producing helicopters with the Wankel engines manufactured by its subsidiary Comotor.
 RE2 Helicopter (flight-tested only)
 Citroën GS BiRotor (flight-tested only)

References